The 134th General Assembly of the U.S. state of Georgia convened its first session on January 10, 1977, at the Georgia State Capitol in Atlanta.  The 134th Georgia General Assembly succeeded the 133rd and served as the precedent for the 135th General Assembly in 1979.

Party standings

Senate

House of Representatives 

*Active political parties in Georgia are not limited to the Democratic and Republican parties. Occasionally, other parties run candidates in elections. Candidates may also run as an "independent". An elected official who has renounced party affiliation, will also be listed as an independent. For the 1977-78 session of the General Assembly, only the two major parties were successful in electing legislators to office.

Officers

Senate

Presiding Officer

Majority leadership

Minority leadership

House of Representatives

Presiding Officer

Majority leadership

Minority leadership

Members of the State Senate

Members of the House of Representatives

External links

Georgia General Assembly website 
Official Georgia Government Publications - Library - Link to "Picture Book"

Georgia (U.S. state) legislative sessions
1977 in American politics
1978 in American politics
1977 in Georgia (U.S. state)
1978 in Georgia (U.S. state)
1977 establishments in Georgia (U.S. state)